Raad-1 ("Thunder-1") is an Iranian self-propelled howitzer.

History
In May 1996, Iran claimed to have successfully tested its first locally made self-propelled howitzer, the 122 mm Raad-1 ("Thunder-1").

It is unknown if the Raad-1 is in production. Analysts think most likely it was just a prototype used to develop the Raad-2.

Description
It is armed with 122 mm 2A18 howitzer from 2S1 Gvozdika self-propelled howitzer or a modification of one with an effective firing range of 15,200 meters. It also has a turret from 2S1 Gvozdika self-propelled howitzer. It uses the Iranian-made Boragh APC chassis, a conversion of either the Russian BMP-1 or Chinese Type 86 (WZ-501) IFV.

See also
Tanks of Iran
Raad - Iranian anti tank missile.
Raad-2

References

Self-propelled artillery of Iran
Military vehicles introduced in the 1990s